Sebastian Schoof (born 22 March 1980) is a German former professional footballer who played as a striker. He spent two seasons in the Bundesliga with Bayer 04 Leverkusen.

References

1980 births
Living people
German footballers
Association football forwards
Bayer 04 Leverkusen players
Bayer 04 Leverkusen II players
Rot-Weiss Essen players
Sportfreunde Siegen players
SC Paderborn 07 players
Rot Weiss Ahlen players
Kickers Emden players
FC Viktoria Köln players
Bundesliga players
2. Bundesliga players
Regionalliga players